The Dr. R. Ahmed Dental College and Hospital is a Government dental college located in Sealdah, Kolkata, in the state of West Bengal, India. It is affiliated to the West Bengal University of Health Sciences and is recognized by Dental Council of India. It teaches Bachelor of Dental Surgery (BDS) and Master of Dental Surgery (MDS) courses in various specialty.

History
Southeast Asias' one of the oldest colleges owes its existence to the legendary visionary Dr. Rafiuddin Ahmed (1890- 1965). This college has produced many notable graduates in the field of dentistry and surgery over the last few decades. It is India's first dental college. The college was established by a one-man team " Dr. Rafiuddin Ahmed".

Courses offered
Dr. R. Ahmed Dental College is four-year undergraduate program followed by one year of internship. Upon completion, you would earn a Bachelor of Dental Surgery (BDS) degree. The postgraduate program requires three years to earn a Master of Dental Surgery (MDS) degree. MDS is offered in the following specialties:

 Oral & Maxillofacial Surgery.
 Orthodontics and Orofacial Orthopaedics.
 Conservative Dentistry and Endodontics.
 Paedodontics.
 Periodontics.
 Prosthodontics and Maxillofacial Prosthesis.
 Oral and Maxillofacial Pathology and Oral Microbiology.

Departments
 Oral & Maxillofacial Surgery.
 Orthodontics and Orofacial Orthopaedics.
 Conservative Dentistry and Endodontics.
 Paedodontics.
 Periodontics.
 Public Health Dentistry.
 Prosthodontics and Maxillofacial Prosthesis.
 Oral and Maxillofacial Pathology and Oral Microbiology.
 Oral Medicine and Radiology

Infrastructure
The institution has facilities with more than 200 dental chairs.  The institute is divided into two campuses: New Campus and the old Campus.
The undergraduate and postgraduate training for both pre-clinical and clinical aspects are imparted at the New and Old campuses. Clinical facilities for training in medical subjects are available at the NRS Medical College.

Hostel Facility:  

Hostel facilities are available for boys and girls.
Boys' Hostel Superintendent: 
Girls' Hostel Superintendent: DR. MEHENDI TIRKEY

Admission
The institution enrolls undergraduates based on their NEET UG scores and admits postgraduates based on their scores in the NEET MDS conducted by the NBE (National Board of Examination) held annually.

Dr. R. Ahmed Dental College Students' Union

Dr. R. Ahmed Dental College Students' Union members  -
President                     - DILWAR HOSSAIN MOLLAH
Vice President1               - ABID HASSAN
Vice President2               - SAYANTEE SARKAR
General Secretary             - MALAY MANDAL
Assistant General Secretary1   - SK OBAIDULLAH
Assistant General Secretary2   - PIYUSH KUMAR SINGH
Social Service Secretary      - AMAR SANKAR PAL
Assistant Service Secretary    - HIMALAYA MAJI
Literary Secretary            - NILANKUSH KR. DAS
Assistant Literary Secretary   - NUR SALAM AHMED
Athletic Secretary            - NILENDU MAJUMDER
Assistant Athletic Secretary   - SAYAK KOTAL
Boys' Commonroom Secretary    - SAYAK MONDAL
Ladies' Commonroom Secretary  - PARAMA BASU

Notable alumni
 Fatima Jinnah, one of the leading founders of Pakistan.

References

Dental colleges in India
Universities and colleges in Kolkata
Affiliates of West Bengal University of Health Sciences
1920 establishments in British India
Educational institutions established in 1920